Drassodes is a genus of ground spiders that was first described by Niklas Westring in 1851.

Species
 it contains 162 species:

D. adisensis Strand, 1906 – Ethiopia
D. affinis (Nicolet, 1849) – Chile
D. afghanus Roewer, 1961 – Afghanistan
D. albicans (Simon, 1878) – Mediterranean
D. andamanensis Tikader, 1977 – India (Andaman Is.)
D. andorranus Denis, 1938 – Andorra
D. angulus Platnick & Shadab, 1976 – USA
D. arapensis Strand, 1908 – Peru
D. archibensis Ponomarev & Alieva, 2008 – Russia (Caucasus)
D. assimilatus (Blackwall, 1865) – Canary Is., Cape Verde Is.
D. astrologus (O. Pickard-Cambridge, 1874) – India
D. auriculoides Barrows, 1919 – USA
D. auritus Schenkel, 1963 – Russia (Europe), Kazakhstan, China
D. bechuanicus Tucker, 1923 – South Africa
D. bendamiranus Roewer, 1961 – Afghanistan
D. bicurvatus Roewer, 1961 – Afghanistan
D. bifidus Kovblyuk & Seyyar, 2009 – Turkey
D. brachythelis (Thorell, 1890) – Indonesia (Sumatra)
D. braendegaardi Caporiacco, 1949 – Kenya
D. caffrerianus Purcell, 1907 – South Africa
D. calceatus Purcell, 1907 – South Africa
D. cambridgei Roewer, 1951 – India
D. canaglensis Caporiacco, 1927 – Italy
D. carinivulvus Caporiacco, 1934 – India
D. caspius Ponomarev & Tsvetkov, 2006 – Turkey, Russia (Europe, Caucasus), Kazakhstan
D. cerinus Simon, 1897 – India
D. charcoviae (Thorell, 1875) – Ukraine
D. charitonovi Tuneva, 2004 – Kazakhstan
D. chybyndensis Esyunin & Tuneva, 2002 – Russia (Europe to Central Asia), Kazakhstan, Iran
D. clavifemur (Reimoser, 1935) – India (Karakorum, Kashmir)
D. crassipalpus (Roewer, 1961) – Afghanistan
D. cupa Tuneva, 2004 – Kazakhstan
D. cupreus (Blackwall, 1834) – Europe, Caucasus, Kazakhstan, Russia (Europe to Far East)
D. dagestanus Ponomarev & Alieva, 2008 – Russia (Caucasus)
D. daliensis Yang & Song, 2003 – China
D. delicatus (Blackwall, 1867) – India
D. deoprayagensis Tikader & Gajbe, 1975 – India
D. depilosus Dönitz & Strand, 1906 – Japan
D. deserticola Simon, 1893 – Algeria, Libya
D. difficilis (Simon, 1878) – Spain, France, Italy, Turkey?
D. dispulsoides Schenkel, 1963 – China
D. distinctus (Lucas, 1846) – Algeria
D. dregei Purcell, 1907 – South Africa
D. drydeni Petrunkevitch, 1914 – Myanmar
D. ellenae (Barrion & Litsinger, 1995) – Philippines
D. ereptor Purcell, 1907 – South Africa
D. falciger Jézéquel, 1965 – Ivory Coast
D. fedtschenkoi (Kroneberg, 1875) – Uzbekistan
D. fugax (Simon, 1878) – Portugal, Spain, France, Italy, Central Asia, China
D. gangeticus Tikader & Gajbe, 1975 – India
D. gia Melic & Barrientos, 2017 – Spain
D. gilvus Tullgren, 1910 – Tanzania
D. gooldi Purcell, 1907 – South Africa
D. gosiutus Chamberlin, 1919 – USA, Canada
D. gujaratensis Patel & Patel, 1975 – India
D. hamiger (Thorell, 1877) – Indonesia (Sulawesi)
D. hebei Song, Zhu & Zhang, 2004 – China
D. helenae Purcell, 1907 – South Africa
D. heterophthalmus Simon, 1905 – India
D. himalayensis Tikader & Gajbe, 1975 – India
D. ignobilis Petrunkevitch, 1914 – Myanmar
D. imbecillus (L. Koch, 1875) – Ethiopia
D. inermis (Simon, 1878) – Spain (Menorca), France
D. infletus (O. Pickard-Cambridge, 1885) – China (Yarkand), Russia (South Siberia), Mongolia
D. insidiator Thorell, 1897 – Myanmar
D. insignis (Blackwall, 1862) – Brazil
D. interemptor (O. Pickard-Cambridge, 1885) – China (Yarkand)
D. interlisus (O. Pickard-Cambridge, 1885) – China (Yarkand)
D. interpolator (O. Pickard-Cambridge, 1885) – Tajikistan, China (Yarkand)
D. involutus (O. Pickard-Cambridge, 1885) – China (Yarkand)
D. jakkabagensis Charitonov, 1946 – Uzbekistan, Turkmenistan
D. jiufeng Tang, Song & Zhang, 2001 – China
D. kaszabi Loksa, 1965 – Russia (South Siberia), Mongolia
D. katunensis Marusik, Hippa & Koponen, 1996 – Russia (South Siberia)
D. kibonotensis Tullgren, 1910 – Tanzania
D. krausi (Roewer, 1961) – Afghanistan
D. kwantungensis Saito, 1937 – China
D. lacertosus (O. Pickard-Cambridge, 1872) – Greece, Turkey, Israel, Syria
D. lapidosus (Walckenaer, 1802) (type) – Europe, Turkey, Israel, Caucasus, Russia (Europe to Far East), Central Asia, China, Korea, Japan
Drassodes l. bidens (Simon, 1878) – France
D. lapsus (O. Pickard-Cambridge, 1885) – China (Yarkand)
D. licenti Schenkel, 1953 – Mongolia
D. lindbergi Roewer, 1961 – Afghanistan
D. lividus Denis, 1958 – Afghanistan
D. longispinus Marusik & Logunov, 1995 – Russia (South Siberia, Far East), China, Korea
D. lophognathus Purcell, 1907 – South Africa
D. luridus (O. Pickard-Cambridge, 1874) – India
D. luteomicans (Simon, 1878) – Southern Europe
D. lutescens (C. L. Koch, 1839) – Mediterranean, Ukraine, Caucasus, Russia (Europe) to Central Asia, Pakistan
D. lyratus Purcell, 1907 – South Africa
D. lyriger Simon, 1909 – Ethiopia
D. macilentus (O. Pickard-Cambridge, 1874) – India
D. malagassicus (Butler, 1880) – Madagascar
D. mandibularis (L. Koch, 1866) – Russia (Europe)
D. manducator (Thorell, 1897) – Myanmar
D. masculus Tucker, 1923 – South Africa
D. mauritanicus Denis, 1945 – North Africa
D. meghalayaensis Tikader & Gajbe, 1977 – India
D. mirus Platnick & Shadab, 1976 – Russia (Far East), North America
D. montenegrinus (Kulczyński, 1897) – Croatia, Serbia
D. monticola (Kroneberg, 1875) – Kazakhstan, Uzbekistan, Tajikistan
D. nagqu Song, Zhu & Zhang, 2004 – China
D. narayanpurensis Gajbe, 2005 – India
D. natali Esyunin & Tuneva, 2002 – Russia (Europe), Kazakhstan
D. neglectus (Keyserling, 1887) – Russia (Middle to East Siberia, Far East), North America
D. nox Dönitz & Strand, 1906 – Japan
D. nugatorius (Karsch, 1881) – Libya, Arabia
D. obscurus (Lucas, 1846) – Algeria
D. parauritus Song, Zhu & Zhang, 2004 – China
D. paroculus Simon, 1893 – Spain
D. parvidens Caporiacco, 1934 – India, Pakistan
D. pashanensis Tikader & Gajbe, 1977 – India
D. pectinifer Schenkel, 1936 – China
D. phagduaensis Tikader, 1964 – Nepal
D. placidulus Simon, 1914 – France
D. platnicki Song, Zhu & Zhang, 2004 – Russia (Europe to South Siberia), Mongolia, China
D. prosthesimiformis Strand, 1906 – Ethiopia
D. pseudolesserti Loksa, 1965 – Kazakhstan, Mongolia, China
D. pubescens (Thorell, 1856) – Europe, Turkey, Israel, Caucasus, Russia (Europe to Far East), Iran, Central Asia, China, Japan
D. robatus Roewer, 1961 – Afghanistan
D. rostratus Esyunin & Tuneva, 2002 – Russia (Europe), Kazakhstan
D. rubicundulus Caporiacco, 1934 – India, Pakistan
D. rubidus (Simon, 1878) – Portugal, Spain, France, Italy (Sardinia)
D. rugichelis Denis, 1962 – Madeira
D. russulus (Thorell, 1890) – Indonesia (Java)
D. saccatus (Emerton, 1890) – North America
D. saganus Strand, 1918 – Japan
D. sagarensis Tikader, 1982 – India
D. saitoi Schenkel, 1963 – China
D. serratichelis (Roewer, 1928) – Spain (Majorca), Greece, Turkey, Ukraine, Israel. Introduced to USA
D. serratidens Schenkel, 1963 – Russia (South Siberia to Far East), China, Korea, Japan
D. sesquidentatus Purcell, 1908 – South Africa
D. shawanensis Song, Zhu & Zhang, 2004 – China
D. similis Nosek, 1905 – Turkey
D. simplex Kulczyński, 1926 – Russia (Kamchatka)
D. simplicivulvus Caporiacco, 1940 – Ethiopia
D. singulariformis Roewer, 1951 – India
D. sirmourensis (Tikader & Gajbe, 1977) – India, China
D. sitae Tikader & Gajbe, 1975 – India
D. sockniensis (Karsch, 1881) – Libya
D. solitarius Purcell, 1907 – South Africa
D. soussensis Denis, 1956 – Morocco
D. splendens Tucker, 1923 – South Africa
D. stationis Tucker, 1923 – South Africa
D. sternatus Strand, 1906 – Ethiopia
D. striatus (L. Koch, 1866) – Hungary, Balkans, Romania, Ukraine
D. subviduatus Strand, 1906 – Ethiopia
D. taehadongensis Paik, 1995 – Korea
D. tarrhunensis (Karsch, 1881) – Libya
D. termezius Roewer, 1961 – Afghanistan
D. tesselatus Purcell, 1907 – South Africa
D. thaleri Hervé, 2009 – France
D. thimei (L. Koch, 1878) – Turkmenistan
D. tikaderi (Gajbe, 1987) – India
D. tiritschensis Miller & Buchar, 1972 – Afghanistan
D. tortuosus Tucker, 1923 – South Africa
D. unicolor (O. Pickard-Cambridge, 1872) – Greece (Crete), Libya, Egypt, Lebanon, Israel
D. uritai Tang, Oldemtu, Zhao & Song, 1999 – China
D. venustus (Nicolet, 1849) – Chile
D. villosus (Thorell, 1856) – Europe, Turkey, Central Asia, Russia (Europe to Far East)
D. viveki (Gajbe, 1992) – India
D. vorax Strand, 1906 – Ethiopia

References

Araneomorphae genera
Cosmopolitan spiders
Gnaphosidae